In S v Pietersen, an important case in South African criminal law, the accused had strangled a fellow inmate in a prison cell. He had ten previous convictions for crimes of violence. He was sentenced to seven years' imprisonment, two of which were suspended.

See also 
 South African criminal law

References 
 S v Pietersen 1994 (2) SACR 434 (C).

Notes 

1994 in South African law
1994 in case law
South African criminal case law